The Trail of the Eagles' Nests of south-western Poland, is a marked trail along a chain of 25 medieval castles between Częstochowa and Kraków. The Trail of the Eagles' Nests was first marked by Kazimierz Sosnowski. Since 1980, much of the area has been designated a protected area known as the Eagle Nests Landscape Park.

The castles date mostly to the 14th century, and were constructed probably by the order of King of Poland Casimir the Great. The trail has been named the "Eagles' Nests", as most of the castles are located on large, tall rocks of the Polish Jura Chain featuring many limestone cliffs, monadnocks and valleys below. They were built along the 14th-century border of Lesser Poland with the province of Silesia, which at that time belonged to the Kingdom of Bohemia.

The Trail of the Eagles' Nests is considered one of the best tourist trails in Poland, marked as No. 1 on the official list of most popular trails in the country. Most of the sites can also be reached by bus.

The castles of the Eagles' Nests 
The Eagles' Nests castles, many of which survived only in the form of picturesque ruins, are perched high on the tallest rocks between Częstochowa and the former Polish capital Kraków. The castles were built to protect Kraków as well as important trading routes against the foreign invaders. Later, the castles passed on into the hands of various Polish aristocratic families.

{| width="90%" cellpadding="5" style="float: center; border: 1px solid #BBB; margin: 1em 0 0 1em;"
|-
| bgcolor=#CAE8F6 colspan="5" | 
|-
! Royal castles
!
! Knight's castles
!
! Defensive watchtowers
|-
| valign="Top" |
 Będzin Castle *
 Bobolice Castle *
 Brzeźnica Castle
 Kraków - Wawel *
 Krzepice Castle
 Lelów Castle
 Ojców Castle *
 Olsztyn Castle *
 Ostrężnik Castle
 Rabsztyn Castle *
 Wieluń Castle
 Żarnowiec Castle

 Babice - Lipowiec Castle
 Siewierz Castle *
 Sławków Castle
| width="3%" |
| valign="Top" |
 Biały Kościół Castle
 Bobrek Castle
 Bydlin Castle *
 Częstochowa - Błeszno Castle
 Danków Castle 
 Koniecpol - Chrząstów Castle
 Koniecpol Stary Castle
 Korzkiew Castle *
 Koziegłowy Castle
 Kraków - Gródek Castle
 Tyniec - Tenczyn Castle
 Krzykawka Castle
 Mirów Castle *
 Morawica Castle
 Morsko - Bąkowiec Castle *
 Pieskowa Skała *
 Pilica Castle *
 Podzamcze - Ogrodzieniec Castle *
 Rudno - Tenczyn Castle
 Smoleń Castle *
 Udórz Castle
 Żarki Castle
| width="3%" |
| valign="Top" |
 Częstochowa - Mirów
 Giebło
 Klucze
 Łutowiec Castle
 Przewodziszowice
 Ryczów Castle
 Siedlec n. Będzin
 Suliszowice
 Wiesiółka
 Złoty Potok 

 Dubie
 Grabowa
 Kraków - Zwierzyniec
 Kwaśniów  
|}

Picture gallery 

Note: the photos above may include structures located just outside the marked Trail of the Eagles' Nests.

See also 
 Dunajec river castles

References 

 Eagles' Nests Trail online map: Waymarked Trails
  Poland by Neil Wilson, Tom Parkinson, Richard Watkins, Lonely Planet
List of castles  
Map of the castles in Śląskie Voivodship  
Map of the castles in Greater Poland Voivodeship 

Hiking trails in Poland
Lesser Poland Voivodeship
Silesian Voivodeship